Środa Wielkopolska  (until 1968 Środa) is a town in western-central Poland, situated in the Greater Poland Voivodeship, about  southeast of Poznań, with 22,001 inhabitants (2009). It is the seat of Środa Wielkopolska County, and of Gmina Środa Wielkopolska (a district within the county).

History

A stronghold existed at the site in the Middle Ages. The oldest known mention of Środa dates back to 1228. Środa was probably granted town rights in 1261. It was a royal town of the Polish Crown, administratively located in the Kalisz Voivodeship in the Greater Poland Province of the Polish Crown. In 1402–1413 Polish King Władysław II Jagiełło built a Gothic castle in Środa. In the 15th century Środa was one of the largest towns in Greater Poland, trade and crafts developed, and from 1454 the sejmiks (regional parliaments) of both the Kalisz and Poznań voivodeships were held in the town.

In the Second Partition of Poland in 1793 the town was annexed by Prussia. In 1807 it was regained by Poles and became part of the short-lived Duchy of Warsaw. In 1815 it was annexed by Prussia for the second time, and from 1871 it also was part of Germany. The town was restored to Poland in 1919, after Poland regained independence after World War I.

During World War II Środa was under German occupation from September 1939 to January 1945. Poles were subjected to mass arrests, expulsions and massacres. The Einsatzgruppe VI entered the town after September 12, 1939. A prison for Poles was established in the town. On September 17, 1939, the Gestapo murdered 21 Poles from Środa in the neighbouring village of Kijewo, and on October 20, 1939, Germans carried out a public execution of 29 Poles, including teachers, merchants, engineers, lawyers, landowners, and post and bank employees, at the market square. Leonard Cybichowski, principal of the local agricultural school, was one of Polish school principals and teachers murdered in the Dachau concentration camp. In 1939, Germans expelled families of Poles who were either murdered in the massacres or deported to Nazi concentration camps as part of the Intelligenzaktion. In 1940, Germans expelled the owners of shops, workshops and bigger houses, which were then handed over to German colonists as part of the Lebensraum policy. Further expulsions were carried out in February 1941. In 1940 the local parish church was closed down.

In 1968 the town's name was changed to Środa Wielkopolska by adding the adjective Wielkopolska after the region of Greater Poland, within which it is located, to distinguish it from the town of Środa Śląska in Lower Silesia. From 1975 to 1998 Środa was administratively part of the former Poznań Voivodeship. In 2017 and 2018 town limits were extended by including parts of the neighbouring village of Kijewo.

Transport
Środa lies on the main railway line from Poznań to Katowice (via Jarocin). There is also a steam railway which runs to Zaniemyśl,  to the southeast.

Notable people born or raised in Środa Wielkopolska 

 Monika Buczkowska (born 1992), operatic soprano
 Arthur Greiser (1897–1946), German Nazi SS officer executed for war crimes
 Klaus von Klitzing (born 1941), German physicist, winner of the 1985 Nobel Prize in Physics 
 Franz Mertens (1840–1927), Polish-Austrian mathematician 
 Rafał Wieruszewski (born 1981), Polish sprinter who specializes in the 400 metres.

International relations

Twin towns — Sister cities
Środa Wielkopolska is twinned with:
  Hoyerswerda, Germany
  Prostějov, Czech Republic

References

External links
 Official town website
 Gallery of Środa Wielkopolska

Cities and towns in Greater Poland Voivodeship
Środa Wielkopolska County
Poznań Voivodeship (1921–1939)